Austin Edward Seferian-Jenkins (born September 29, 1992) is a former American football tight end. He was drafted by the Tampa Bay Buccaneers in the second round of the 2014 NFL Draft. He played college football at Washington. He also played for the New York Jets and Jacksonville Jaguars.

Early years 
Seferian-Jenkins attended Gig Harbor High School in Gig Harbor, Washington. He played football for the Gig Harbor High School Tides. He had 126 receptions during his career and played in the 2011 U.S. Army All-American Bowl.

Regarded as a four-star recruit by Rivals.com, Seferian-Jenkins was ranked as the second-ranked tight end prospect in his class, behind Nick O'Leary and ahead of Jace Amaro. He chose his home-state school, The University of Washington, over offers from Alabama, Miami (FL), Notre Dame, Oklahoma, Southern California, and Texas because Washington was the only big school to offer him the opportunity to play both basketball and football.

College career
As a true freshman in the 2011 season, Seferian-Jenkins started 10 of 13 games and had 41 receptions for 538 yards and six touchdowns. In addition to football, he played basketball as a freshman. In his sophomore season, he recorded 69 receptions for 852 yards and seven touchdowns. He finished third in the Mackey Award voting. Upon completing his sophomore season, he had already set Washington records with 110 receptions, 1,390 receiving yards, and 13 touchdowns for the tight end position. On August 12, 2013, Seferian-Jenkins suffered a broken pinkie during practice. Head coach Steve Sarkisian announced the next day that Seferian-Jenkins will have to undergo surgery to repair the broken pinkie. Following Washington's 31-16 victory in the 2013 Fight Hunger Bowl, he announced he would leave school early and enter the 2014 NFL Draft. He finished his last year with Washington with 36 receptions for 450 receiving yards and eight receiving touchdowns.

Collegiate statistics

Professional career
Seferian-Jenkins was a projected a second-round selection by CBS Sports in the 2014 NFL Draft.

Tampa Bay Buccaneers
Seferian-Jenkins was drafted by the Tampa Bay Buccaneers in the second round with the 38th overall pick in the 2014 NFL Draft.

2014 season
In his rookie season, Sefarian-Jenkins played in nine games making 21 catches for 221 yards and two touchdowns. On October 26, he caught his first career touchdown, which was a seven-yard pass from Mike Glennon, against the Minnesota Vikings. He caught his second and last touchdown of the season, a one-yard pass from Josh McCown, against the Atlanta Falcons. His season was cut short by an injury, landing him on the team's Injured Reserve list.

2015 season
In the 2015 season, with rookie quarterback and first overall pick Jameis Winston, Seferian-Jenkins looked to expand on his rookie season. He had a career day in a season opening loss to the Tennessee Titans. He had five receptions for 110 yards and two touchdowns, which were a five-yard reception in the second quarter and a 41-yard reception in the fourth quarter. Both of Seferian-Jenkins's touchdowns were the first touchdown passes of Jameis Winston's NFL career. Seferian-Jenkins's remainder of his 2015 season would not have the success he had in the season opener. He only scored two more touchdowns on the season, which were a nine-yard reception from Winston against the St. Louis Rams and a 43-yard reception from Winston against the Chicago Bears. He played in seven games with 338 receiving yards and four touchdowns.

2016 season
Seferian-Jenkins played in the season opener against the Atlanta Falcons at the Georgia Dome. He had one reception for 30 yards and a touchdown, which would be his only one of the 2016 season. He played one more game with the Buccaneers on September 18, which was against the Arizona Cardinals at the University of Phoenix Stadium. He had two receptions for 14 yards in the 40-7 loss. On September 23, 2016, Seferian-Jenkins was arrested on a DUI charge and was released by the Buccaneers later that day.

New York Jets

2016 season
On September 26, 2016, Seferian-Jenkins was claimed off waivers by the New York Jets.

Seferian-Jenkins recorded 10 total receptions for 110 yards in seven games with the Jets.

2017 season
On March 15, 2017, Seferian-Jenkins was suspended the first two weeks of the 2017 season for violating the NFL Policy and Program for Substances of Abuse.

During Week 6 against the New England Patriots, Seferian-Jenkins fumbled inches from the endzone, in which the ball landed out of bounds in the endzone, resulting in a touchback. The call was controversial, but ultimately the error loomed large, as the Jets lost the game 17–24. He played in 13 games, of which he started ten, in the 2017 season. He finished with 50 receptions for 357 receiving yards and three receiving touchdowns.

Jacksonville Jaguars
On March 15, 2018, Seferian-Jenkins signed a two-year, $10 million contract with the Jacksonville Jaguars. He was placed on injured reserve on October 9, 2018, after aggravating a core muscle injury. He played in five games in the 2018 season. He recorded 11 receptions for 90 receiving yards and one touchdown.

On February 18, 2019, the Jaguars declined the option on Seferian-Jenkins' contract, making him a free agent at the start of the new league year.

New England Patriots
On April 10, 2019, Seferian-Jenkins signed a one-year contract with the New England Patriots. He was released on June 4, 2019, citing personal issues.

NFL statistics

Personal life
On March 9, 2013, Seferian-Jenkins was cited for driving under the influence in the University District of Seattle. In July 2013, he pleaded guilty to DUI and served a day in jail. The football team suspended Seferian-Jenkins for one game, the Huskies' 2013 season opener against Boise State.

In addition, Seferian-Jenkins cited for DUI on the morning of Friday, September 23, 2016. He was released by the Tampa Bay Buccaneers on the same day of the incident.

In May 2017, Seferian-Jenkins opened up regarding his struggles with alcohol, and indicated that he had sought help by attending rehab on an outpatient basis.

Seferian-Jenkins was arrested for DUI for a third time on March 9, 2020.

On January 31, 2022, Seferian-Jenkins was arrested for fourth-degree assault, felony harassment and interfering with the reporting of domestic violence.

See also
 Washington Huskies football statistical leaders

References

External links

 Washington Huskies football bio
 Washington Huskies basketball bio

1992 births
Living people
African-American players of American football
American football tight ends
American men's basketball players
American people of Armenian descent
Basketball players from Washington (state)
Jacksonville Jaguars players
New England Patriots players
New York Jets players
People from Fox Island, Washington
Players of American football from Washington (state)
Sportspeople from the Seattle metropolitan area
Tampa Bay Buccaneers players
Washington Huskies football players
Washington Huskies men's basketball players
21st-century African-American sportspeople